Patrick Smith (17 July 1901 – 18 March 1982) was an Irish Fianna Fáil politician, who served as a Teachta Dála from 1923 until 1977; a tenure of 53 years, the longest in the state. He held a number of ministerial positions within the governments of Éamon de Valera and Seán Lemass.

Early life
Smith was born in the town of Bailieborough, County Cavan, the eighth and youngest child of Terence Smith, a farmer, and Ellen Smith (née MacManus). He joined the Irish Republican Brotherhood, he took a small role in the Easter Rising of 1916. By 1920, he was involved with the Irish Republican Army and was one of its youngest commandants, at the age of 19. He was captured by British forces in 1921, along with Seán Moylan, who would go on to become a government colleague. He was interned, put on trial for treason but he was spared after a truce was called between the British Army and the IRA during the Irish War of Independence. After the signing of the Anglo-Irish Treaty, Smith sided with de Valera and the Anti-Treaty side of the Irish Civil War. Smith had felt that the Irish negotiators did not test the British delegation enough, this sentiment would last with him well into his political career, Smith being said to have shouted across the floor at Dáil Éireann, "They gave us stepping-stones, but they [state forces in 1922] would not walk on them." A play on the same quote by Irish revolutionary leader, Michael Collins.

Spanish Civil War veteran
During the Spanish Civil War Smith was a member of the Connolly Column (a group of Irish republican socialist volunteers). In Spain made the acquaintance of the founder of the Communist Party of Ireland Michael O'Riordan. During his time in Spain Smith was wounded by a bayonet and carried the scar on his head for the rest of his life.

Irish politics
He entered the Dáil in September 1923, as a Republican candidate. In 1926, Éamon de Valera, the Leader of Anti-Treaty Sinn Fein, approached Smith and persuaded him to join his newly founded political party, Fianna Fáil. Fianna Fail abandoned the abstentionist policy of Anti Treaty Sinn Fein and its elected members took their seats in Dáil Éireann. De Valera and Smith had a strong personal and professional relationship; Smith had a strong loyalty for Fianna Fail and by extension, de Valera, whom he often defended from allegations of totalitarian style policies. Smith refuted these allegations, citing that he felt de Valera had always given a voice to members of the party. He worked as Parliamentary Secretary at the Department of the Taoiseach (Government Chief Whip). Smith identified this time during World War II as his most fulfilling period in Irish politics.

He was appointed as Parliamentary Secretary to the Minister for Finance in 1943. He served under Seán T. O'Kelly and Frank Aiken during his tenure in the department. He was briefly Parliamentary Secretary to the Minister for Agriculture in January 1947, before his appointment as Minister for Agriculture later that month. He held this position until the collapse of the Fianna Fáil government which had been in power for nearly 16 years. The party was in opposition until the 1951 Irish general election. Smith was then appointed as Minister for Local Government. Smith focused on many social issues, especially the tuberculosis issue in Ireland. He advocated for the reduction of overcrowding in the slums of Dublin. He also oversaw the doubling of the car license fee to ensure the government had enough cashflow for the upkeep of urban and rural roads. The improvement of roads also facilitated unemployment programs by offering recruitment opportunities to work on the roads. The fund for road improvement soon amounted to £3 million, and work began on surfacing the 34,000 miles of road which remained below standard. The Fianna Fail government collapsed in 1954 and was replaced by the Second Inter-Party Government, led by John A. Costello; Smith returned to the position of Minister for Local Government when Fianna Fail were re-elected at the 1957 Irish general election.

Smith was appointed again as Minister for Agriculture in 1957 when Fianna Fail returned to government. His main objectives while in this office were to eliminate cattle tuberculosis, which proved to be a serious issue for Irish farmers at the time. He also encouraged greater productivity from the primary economic sector, specifically farming and also aimed to improve grassland quality across the island. Outside of agriculture, Smith continued to serve as Minister for Local Government. He also was part of a group of ministers who supervised the First Programme for Economic Expansion, an economic development plan by T. K. Whitaker, Secretary at the Department of Finance, that has been heavily praised as the programme that helped kickstart Ireland's economic growth which would take full form in the mid-1990s. He also had a spell as Minister for Social Welfare.

Smith continued to serve under Seán Lemass, but became disillusioned with the Taoiseach about relations with trade unions. Smith felt Lemass was too easily influenced by trade unions and in protest he resigned from all his ministerial positions in 1964. Smith was not appointed to cabinet by Jack Lynch upon his succession as Taoiseach in 1966 and Smith would spend the remainder of his parliamentary career on the Fianna Fáil backbenches. During the Arms Crisis, Smith, like many of the founding members of Fianna Fail, sided with Lynch against Charles Haughey and Neil Blaney. Smith retired from politics in 1977 at the age of 75. In the 1979 leadership election for Fianna Fail, Smith again sided with the more traditional members of the party in supporting the leadership campaign of George Colley, who was also endorsed by Lynch. Haughey won the election and would lead Fianna Fail until 1992.

Smith died on 18 March 1982, aged 80, at his home in Castleblayney, County Monaghan. He was survived by his wife, Mary Ward and his 6 children. He body was returned to his ancestral parish of Knockbride, a townland outside of Bailieborough, County Cavan. He was buried in West Knockbride Chapel, with his graveside oration given by Charles Haughey, who had been appointed Taoiseach a number of days earlier.

References

 

1901 births
1982 deaths
Fianna Fáil TDs
Members of the 4th Dáil
Members of the 5th Dáil
Members of the 6th Dáil
Members of the 7th Dáil
Members of the 8th Dáil
Members of the 9th Dáil
Members of the 10th Dáil
Members of the 11th Dáil
Members of the 12th Dáil
Members of the 13th Dáil
Members of the 14th Dáil
Members of the 15th Dáil
Members of the 16th Dáil
Members of the 17th Dáil
Members of the 18th Dáil
Members of the 19th Dáil
Members of the 20th Dáil
People of the Easter Rising
Politicians from County Cavan
Early Sinn Féin TDs
Ministers for Agriculture (Ireland)
Ministers for Social Affairs (Ireland)
Parliamentary Secretaries of the 12th Dáil
Parliamentary Secretaries of the 11th Dáil
Parliamentary Secretaries of the 10th Dáil
Government Chief Whip (Ireland)